Norbert Sprongl (30 April 1892 – 26 April 1983) was an Austrian composer. His work was part of the music event in the art competition at the 1936 Summer Olympics.

References

1892 births
1983 deaths
Austrian male composers
Olympic competitors in art competitions
People from Hollabrunn District
20th-century male musicians